Ronnie Kisekka(born 5 December 1991) is a Ugandan footballer, who plays as a defender.

International career
In January 2014, coach Milutin Sedrojevic, invited him to be included in the Uganda national football team for the 2014 African Nations Championship. The team placed third in the group stage of the competition after beating Burkina Faso, drawing with Zimbabwe and losing to Morocco.

References

1991 births
Living people
Ugandan footballers
Uganda A' international footballers
2014 African Nations Championship players
Uganda international footballers
Proline FC players
Kampala Capital City Authority FC players
Bright Stars FC players
Express FC players
Association football defenders